The 2012–13 Miami Heat season was the franchise's 25th season in the National Basketball Association (NBA). They came into the season as the defending NBA champions, back-to-back Eastern Conference champions, the third season playing with the "Big Three" of LeBron James, Dwyane Wade and Chris Bosh, and the fifth season under head coach Erik Spoelstra.

During the season, the Heat embarked on a 27-game winning streak, which at the time ranked as the second longest winning streak in NBA history, and finished with a 66–16 record, the best record with the Big Three and a franchise best. James, Wade and Bosh were all selected for the 2013 NBA All-Star Game, while James won his fourth NBA Most Valuable Player Award at the end of the season, just one vote shy of winning the award unanimously.

On June 3, 2013, the Heat defeated the Indiana Pacers in game seven of the Eastern Conference Finals to become the first team since the Chicago Bulls in 1998 to Three-peat as Eastern Conference champions. The Heat then defeated the San Antonio Spurs in an NBA Finals that went the full seven games, handing the Spurs their first loss in the NBA Finals, and with this victory in the NBA Finals, it echoed the 1997–98 Bulls, as they had also been the last Eastern team to repeat as NBA champions. Because of their dominant regular and postseason performance as well as James' individual achievements, this Miami Heat team is widely regarded as one of the greatest teams in NBA history.

Key dates

June 28: The 2012 NBA draft took place at Prudential Center in Newark, New Jersey.
July 11: In an utmost to bolster the roster, the Heat signed NBA veterans Rashard Lewis and Ray Allen, the NBA's all-time leader in three-pointers made.
October 30: The Heat opened the season with a 120–107 home victory over the Boston Celtics. The previous year's players received their championship rings and the team raised their 2nd championship banner into the American Airlines Arena rafters.
November 3: LeBron James was honored before the game when the team raised a banner for his Olympic achievement. He is the fourth player in Heat history to win a gold medal, joining Dwyane Wade, Tim Hardaway and Alonzo Mourning.
November 21: Udonis Haslem surpassed Alonzo Mourning in all-time rebounding for the Miami Heat and became the first undrafted player in NBA history to lead a franchise in rebounding. Adding to this accomplishment, Haslem has now starred in the most Miami Heat games played, one more than fellow captain Dwyane Wade.
November 24: Chris Bosh surpassed the 13,000-point plateau.
December 15: For the first time in franchise history, all 13 active players scored at least three points and converted one made field goal.
December 25: Mike Miller surpassed the 10,000-point plateau.
January 5: Terrel Harris was released.
January 7: Josh Harrellson was released.
January 8: Jarvis Varnado signed to a ten-day contract after being released from the Boston Celtics.
January 10: The last time the Heat lost consecutive games. Throughout the rest of the regular season and the playoffs, they never had a losing streak over 1 game. 
January 16: LeBron James became the youngest player in NBA history to score 20,000 points.  LeBron James also surpassed the 5,000-assist plateau.
January 20: Chris Andersen signed to a ten-day contract.
January 30: Chris Andersen signed to a second ten-day contract.
February 3: The Heat beat the Toronto Raptors on Super Bowl Sunday to start what would become the longest winning streak in the franchise and second in NBA history in a single season.
February 8: Chris Andersen signed for the remainder of the season.
February 12: LeBron James became the only player in NBA history to post 30+ points and shoot over 60% for six consecutive games.
February 12: The Heat win their 1000th game in team history. They became the ninth fastest franchise to do so, posting a 1000-969 (.508) record on this date.
February 21: Dexter Pittman traded to the Memphis Grizzlies in exchange for the draft rights to Ricky Sánchez.
February 23: Dwyane Wade surpassed the 16,000-point plateau.
March 2: Juwan Howard signed a 10-day contract, re-joining the Heat.
March 4: The Heat beat the Minnesota Timberwolves 97–81 to extend their winning streak to a franchise-record 15 wins in a row, improving their record to 44–14.
March 8: The Heat beat the Philadelphia 76ers 102–93, becoming the first team in the league to clinch a playoff berth and extending their winning streak to 17. They also marked their best record through 60 games in franchise history at 46–14.
March 10: For the first time in franchise history, the Heat beat every single team in the NBA with their victory against the Indiana Pacers. Miami was able to defeat all 29 opponents by their 61st game.
March 12: Juwan Howard signed to a second 10-day contract.
March 18: The Heat came back from a 17-point deficit to beat the Boston Celtics 105-103 by LeBron James game winning shot over Brandon Bass to clinch the Southeast Division for the third consecutive year and extend their winning streak to 23 games, the second longest in NBA history.
March 20: The Heat overcame a league high 27-point third-quarter deficit beat the Cleveland Cavaliers 98–95 to extend their winning streak to 24 games.
March 22: The Heat overcame an 11-point deficit to beat Detroit Pistons 103–89 to extend their winning streak to 25 games. This is the third consecutive game in which the Heat came back from double digit deficits, the fifth during the streak, and 11th of the season. Juwan Howard signed for the remainder of the season.
March 24: The Heat overcame an 11-point deficit with Dwyane Wade inactive to beat Charlotte Bobcats 109–77 to extend their winning streak to 26 games. This is the fourth consecutive game in which the Heat came back from double digit deficits, the 6th during the streak, and 12th of the season.
March 25: The Heat beat Orlando 108–94 to extend their winning streak to 27 games.
March 27: The Heat fall 101–97 to the Chicago Bulls, ending their winning streak at 27(Second longest winning streak in a season in NBA history).
March 29: The Heat defeated the New Orleans Hornets 108–89, clinching the best record in the Eastern Conference for the third time in franchise history.
March 31: The Heat defeated the San Antonio Spurs 88-86 without all-stars LeBron James and Dwyane Wade, along with Mario Chalmers, becoming the first team in NBA history to win at least 17 games in a calendar month.
April 10: The Heat defeated the Washington Wizards 103–98, clinching the best record in the NBA and home-court advantage throughout the playoffs for the first time in franchise history, and improving their record to 62–16 to set a franchise record for wins in a season.
April 14: The Heat defeated the Chicago Bulls 105–93, avenging the March 27 loss and winning their 36th game at home, the most in franchise history.
April 15: The 16th back-to-back game night. The Heat earned a 15–1 record (.938) on the second night of a back-to-back set this season, tying Dallas (2006–07) for the best record on the second night of a back-to-back set in NBA history.
April 17: The Heat concluded the regular season with a 105–93 victory over the Orlando Magic. They finished the season with a record of 66–16, going 37–4 at home and 29–12 on the road.
April 28: The Heat defeated the Milwaukee Bucks in Game 4 of the Eastern Conference First Round, advancing to the Conference Semi-Finals.
May 15: The Heat defeated the Chicago Bulls in Game 5 of the Eastern Conference Semi-Finals, advancing to the Conference Finals.
June 3: The Heat defeated the Indiana Pacers in Game 7 of the Eastern Conference Finals, advancing to the NBA Finals for a third consecutive season, making them the first Eastern Conference team to accomplish this since the Chicago Bulls (1996–1998).  Dwyane Wade also snapped a 12-game streak where he scored less than 20 points.
June 18: The Heat came back from a 13-point deficit in the 4th quarter to defeat the San Antonio Spurs in Game 6 of the NBA Finals, with LeBron James scoring 18 points in the period and Ray Allen hitting a 3 to tie the game with 5 seconds left in regulation.
June 20: The Heat defeated the San Antonio Spurs in the NBA Finals to repeat as NBA Champions.

Draft picks

 Traded to the Philadelphia 76ers for draft rights to Justin Hamilton and a future first-round pick.

Roster

Pre-season

|- style="background:#fcc;"
| 1
| October 7
| @ Atlanta
| 
| Chris Bosh (22)
| Bosh, James & Dozier (6)
| LeBron James (6)
| Philips Arena12,828
| 0–1
|- style="background:#cfc;"
| 2
| October 11
| @ L.A. Clippers
| 
| LeBron James (20)
| LeBron James (5)
| LeBron James (5)
| MasterCard Center, China17,006
| 1–1
|- style="background:#fcc;"
| 3
| October 14
| L.A. Clippers
| 
| Rodney Carney (15)
| Josh Harrellson (6)
| LeBron James (4)
| Mercedes-Benz Arena, China17,292
| 1–2
|- style="background:#cfc;"
| 4
| October 18
| Detroit
| 
| Dwyane Wade (21)
| Bosh & Battier (6)
| LeBron James (8)
| American Airlines Arena19,600
| 2–2
|- style="background:#cfc;"
| 5
| October 20
| San Antonio
| 
| Rashard Lewis (15)
| Dexter Pittman (6)
| Garrett Temple (6)
| American Airlines Arena19,600
| 3–2
|- style="background:#cfc;"
| 6
| October 23
| @ Charlotte
| 
| Chris Bosh (21)
| Chris Bosh (7)
| LeBron James (8)
| Time Warner Cable Arena17,924
| 4–2
|- style="background:#fcc;"
| 7
| October 24
| Washington
| 
| Dwyane Wade (23)
| Udonis Haslem (8)
| LeBron James (6)
| Sprint Center16,143
| 4–3
|- style="background:#fcc;"
| 8
| October 26
| New Orleans
| 
| Chris Bosh (21)
| Chris Bosh (10)
| Mario Chalmers (5)
| American Airlines Arena19,600
| 4-4

Regular season

Game log

|- style="background:#cfc;"
| 1
| October 30
| Boston
| 
| Dwyane Wade (29)
| James & Bosh (10)
| Mario Chalmers (11)
| American Airlines Arena20,296
| 1-0

|- style="background:#fcc;"
| 2
| November 2
| @ New York	
| 
| LeBron James (23)
| Chris Bosh (11)
| LeBron James (5)
| Madison Square Garden19,033
| 1-1							
|- style="background:#cfc;"
| 3
| November 3
| Denver
| 
| Chris Bosh (40)
| LeBron James (9)
| LeBron James (11)
| American Airlines Arena20,296
| 2-1
|- style="background:#cfc;"
| 4
| November 5
| Phoenix
| 
| LeBron James (23)
| LeBron James (11)
| Mario Chalmers (11)
| American Airlines Arena19,600
| 3-1								
|- style="background:#cfc;"
| 5
| November 7
| Brooklyn
| 
| Dwyane Wade (22)
| LeBron James (12)
| LeBron James (8)
| American Airlines Arena19,627
| 4-1								
|- style="background:#cfc;"
| 6
| November 9
| @ Atlanta
| 
| Chris Bosh (24)
| LeBron James (11)
| LeBron James (9)
| Philips Arena16,785
| 5-1								
|- style="background:#fcc;"
| 7
| November 11
| @ Memphis
| 
| Chris Bosh (22)
| LeBron James (10)
| LeBron James (6)
| FedEx Forum18,119
| 5-2								
|- style="background:#cfc;"
| 8
| November 12
| @ Houston	
| 
| LeBron James (38)
| James & Bosh (10)
| Dwyane Wade (7)
| Toyota Center18,041
| 6-2							
|- style="background:#fcc;"
| 9
| November 14
| @ L.A. Clippers	
| 
| LeBron James (30)
| Chris Bosh (9)
| LeBron James (7)
| Staples Center19,146
| 6-3							
|- style="background:#cfc;"
| 10
| November 15
| @ Denver
| 
| LeBron James (27)
| LeBron James (7)
| LeBron James (12)
| Pepsi Center19,155
| 7-3								
|- style="background:#cfc;"
| 11
| November 17
| @ Phoenix
| 
| Chris Bosh (24)
| Chris Bosh (9)
| Mike Miller (5)
| US Airways Center16,840
| 8-3								
|- style="background:#cfc;"
| 12
| November 21
| Milwaukee
| 
| James & Wade (28)
| Chris Bosh (18)
| LeBron James (8)
| American Airlines Arena19,971
| 9-3								
|- style="background:#cfc;"
| 13
| November 24
| Cleveland	
| 
| LeBron James (30)
| Bosh & Wade (7)
| LeBron James (5)
| American Airlines Arena20,064
| 10-3							
|- style="background:#cfc;"
| 14
| November 29
| San Antonio
| 
| LeBron James (23)
| Chris Bosh (12)
| LeBron James (7)
| American Airlines Arena19,703
| 11-3								

|- style="background:#cfc;"
| 15
| December 1
| Brooklyn	
| 
| Dwyane Wade (34)
| LeBron James (9)
| Dwyane Wade (7)
| American Airlines Arena19,961
| 12-3							
|- style="background:#fcc;"
| 16
| December 4
| @ Washington
| 
| LeBron James (26)
| LeBron James (13)
| LeBron James (11)
| Verizon Center17,761
| 12-4
|- style="background:#fcc;"
| 17
| December 6
| New York	
| 
| LeBron James (31)
| LeBron James (10)
| LeBron James (9)
| American Airlines Arena19,740
| 12-5							
|- style="background:#cfc;"
| 18
| December 8
| New Orleans	
| 
| Dwyane Wade (26)
| Chris Bosh (6)
| LeBron James (7)
| American Airlines Arena19,600
| 13-5							
|- style="background:#cfc;"
| 19
| December 10
| Atlanta
| 
| LeBron James (27)
| Chris Bosh (10)
| LeBron James (6)
| American Airlines Arena19,600
| 14-5
|- style="background:#fcc;"
| 20
| December 12
| Golden State
| 
| LeBron James (31)
| Chris Bosh (13)
| James & Wade (5)
| American Airlines Arena19,600
| 14-6
|- style="background:#cfc;"
| 21
| December 15
| Washington
| 
| LeBron James (23)
| LeBron James (10)
| Dwyane Wade (6)
| American Airlines Arena19,724
| 15-6								
|- style="background:#cfc;"
| 22
| December 18
| Minnesota
| 
| Dwyane Wade (24)
| LeBron James (6)
| LeBron James (11)
| American Airlines Arena19,862
| 16-6								
|- style="background:#cfc;"
| 23
| December 20
| @ Dallas
| 
| LeBron James (24)
| LeBron James (9)
| Dwyane Wade (6)
| American Airlines Center20,160
| 17-6								
|- style="background:#cfc;"
| 24
| December 22
| Utah
| 
| LeBron James (30)
| James & Haslem (9)
| James & Wade (7)
| American Airlines Arena20,087
| 18-6								
|- style="background:#cfc;"
| 25
| December 25
| Oklahoma City
| 
| LeBron James (29)
| LeBron James (8)
| LeBron James (9)
| American Airlines Arena20,300
| 19-6								
|- style="background:#cfc;"
| 26
| December 26
| @ Charlotte
| 
| Dwyane Wade (29)
| LeBron James (12)
| LeBron James (8)
| Time Warner Cable Arena19,602
| 20-6							
|- style="background:#fcc;"
| 27
| December 28
| @ Detroit
| 
| LeBron James (35)
| Chris Bosh (9)
| James & Cole (5)
| Palace of Auburn Hills22,076
| 20-7								
|- style="background:#fcc;"
| 28
| December 29
| @ Milwaukee
| 
| LeBron James (26)
| Chris Bosh (16)
| LeBron James (7)
| BMO Harris Bradley Center18,717
| 20-8			
|- style="background:#cfc;"
| 29
| December 31
| @ Orlando
| 
| LeBron James (36)
| LeBron James (8)
| LeBron James (11)
| Amway Center19,311
| 21-8			

					
|- style="background:#cfc;"
| 30
| January 2
| Dallas
| 
| LeBron James (32)
| LeBron James (12)
| LeBron James (9)
| American Airlines Arena20,102
| 22-8								
|- style="background:#fcc;"
| 31
| January 4
| Chicago	
| 
| LeBron James (30)
| LeBron James (6)
| Chris Bosh (5)
| American Airlines Arena20,138
| 22-9							
|- style="background:#cfc;"
| 32
| January 6
| Washington	
| 
| LeBron James (24)
| Udonis Haslem (12)
| LeBron James (7)
| American Airlines Arena20,228
| 23-9							
|- style="background:#fcc;"
| 33
| January 8
| @ Indiana	
| 
| Dwyane Wade (30)
| LeBron James (10)
| LeBron James (4)
| Bankers Life Fieldhouse18,165
| 23-10							
|- style="background:#fcc;"
| 34
| January 10
| @ Portland		
| 
| Chris Bosh (29)
| LeBron James (10)
| LeBron James (9)
| Rose Garden20,536
| 23-11							
|- style="background:#cfc;"
| 35
| January 12
| @ Sacramento	
| 
| Mario Chalmers (34)
| Udonis Haslem (8)
| James & Wade (7)
| Sleep Train Arena14,367
| 24-11						
|- style="background:#fcc;"
| 36
| January 14
| @ Utah	
| 
| LeBron James (32)
| Haslem & Wade (5)
| Mario Chalmers (7)
| EnergySolutions Arena19,911
| 24-12							
|- style="background:#cfc;"
| 37
| January 16
| @ Golden State
| 
| LeBron James (25)
| Udonis Haslem (10)
| LeBron James (10)
| Oracle Arena19,596
| 25-12
|- style="background:#cfc;"
| 38
| January 17
| @ L.A. Lakers		
| 
| LeBron James (39)
| James & Haslem (7)
| LeBron James (8)
| Staples Center18,997
| 26-12						
|- style="background:#cfc;"
| 39
| January 23
| Toronto	
| 
| Dwyane Wade (35)
| Chris Bosh (12)
| LeBron James (11)
| American Airlines Arena20,002
| 27-12							
|- style="background:#cfc;"
| 40
| January 25
| Detroit	
| 
| Dwyane Wade (29)
| James & Bosh (7)
| James & Wade (7)
| American Airlines Arena20,236
| 28-12							
|- style="background:#fcc;"
| 41
| January 27
| @ Boston	
| 
| LeBron James (34)
| James & Bosh (16)
| James & Wade (7)
| TD Garden18,624
| 28-13							
|- style="background:#cfc;"
| 42
| January 30
| @ Brooklyn
| 
| LeBron James (24)
| LeBron James (9)
| LeBron James (7)
| Barclays Center17,732
| 29-13								

|- style="background:#fcc;"
| 43
| February 1
| @ Indiana	
| 
| LeBron James (28)
| James & Wade (6)
| Wade & Allen (5)
| Bankers Life Fieldhouse18,165
| 29-14							
|- style="background:#cfc;"
| 44
| February 3
| @ Toronto	
| 
| LeBron James (30)
| LeBron James (8)
| LeBron James (7)
| Air Canada Centre19,800
| 30-14					
|- style="background:#cfc;"
| 45
| February 4
| Charlotte
| 
| LeBron James (31)
| Dwyane Wade (12)
| LeBron James (8)
| American Airlines Arena19,600
| 31-14								
|- style="background:#cfc;"
| 46
| February 6
| Houston
| 
| LeBron James (32)
| Udonis Haslem (13)
| Dwyane Wade (8)
| American Airlines Arena19,693
| 32-14								
|- style="background:#cfc;"
| 47
| February 8
| L.A. Clippers
| 
| LeBron James (30)
| Rashard Lewis (7)
| Dwyane Wade (7)
| American Airlines Arena19,902
| 33-14								
|- style="background:#cfc;"
| 48
| February 10
| L.A. Lakers
| 
| LeBron James (32)
| Chris Bosh (11)
| James & Wade (5)
| American Airlines Arena20,300
| 34-14								
|- style="background:#cfc;"
| 49
| February 12
| Portland	
| 
| Chris Bosh (32)
| Chris Bosh (11)
| LeBron James (9)
| American Airlines Arena20,032
| 35-14							
|- style="background:#cfc;"
| 50
| February 14
| @ Oklahoma City	
| 
| LeBron James (39)
| James & Bosh (12)
| Dwyane Wade (8)
| Chesapeake Energy Arena18,203
| 36-14
|- align="center"
|colspan="9" bgcolor="#bbcaff"|All-Star Break
|- style="background:#cfc;"
| 51
| February 20
| @ Atlanta	
| 
| LeBron James (24)
| James & Bosh (6)
| LeBron James (11)
| Philips Arena18,238
| 37-14							
|- style="background:#cfc"
| 52
| February 21
| @ Chicago	
| 
| LeBron James (26)
| LeBron James (12)
| LeBron James (7)
| United Center22,640
| 38-14							
|- style="background:#cfc"
| 53
| February 23
| @ Philadelphia
| 
| Dwyane Wade (33)
| LeBron James (10)
| LeBron James (11)
| Wells Fargo Center20,665
| 39-14							
|- style="background:#cfc"
| 54
| February 24
| Cleveland		
| 
| LeBron James (28)
| Udonis Haslem (10)
| LeBron James (8)
| American Airlines Arena20,006
| 40-14	
|- style="background:#cfc;"
| 55
| February 26
| Sacramento		
| 
| LeBron James (40)
| James, Wade  & Bosh (8)
| LeBron James (16)
| American Airlines Arena19,734
| 41-14
|- style="background:;"	

	
|- style="background:#cfc;"
| 56
| March 1
| Memphis	
| 
| Dwyane Wade (22)
| LeBron James (8)
| LeBron James (10)
| American Airlines Arena20,128
| 42-14		
|- style="background:#cfc;"
| 57
| March 3
| @ New York	
| 
| LeBron James (29)
| LeBron James (11)
| Dwyane Wade (8)
| Madison Square Garden19,033
| 43-14						
|- style="background:#cfc;"
| 58
| March 4
| @ Minnesota	
| 
| Dwyane Wade (32)
| LeBron James (10)
| Dwyane Wade (10)
| Target Center18,391
| 44-14							
|- style="background:#cfc;"
| 59
| March 6
| Orlando		
| 
| LeBron James (26)
| Chris Bosh (10)
| Mario Chalmers (5)
| American Airlines Arena20,001
| 45-14						
|- style="background:#cfc;"
| 60
| March 8
| Philadelphia
| 
| LeBron James (25)
| LeBron James (10)
| LeBron James (5)
| American Airlines Arena20,029
| 46-14
|- style="background:#cfc;"
| 61
| March 10
| Indiana	
| 
| Mario Chalmers (26)
| Mario Chalmers (7)
| LeBron James (7)
| American Airlines Arena20,219
| 47-14							
|- style="background:#cfc;"
| 62
| March 12
| Atlanta	
| 
| Dwyane Wade (23)
| Udonis Haslem (11)
| LeBron James (7)
| American Airlines Arena20,350
| 48-14
|- style="background:#cfc;"
| 63
| March 13
| @ Philadelphia	
| 
| LeBron James (27)
| Dwyane Wade (8)
| LeBron James (8)
| Wells Fargo Center20,398
| 49-14
|- style="background:#cfc;"
| 64
| March 15
| @ Milwaukee		
| 
| LeBron James (28)
| LeBron James (10)
| Dwyane Wade (9)
| BMO Harris Bradley Center18,717
| 50-14
|- style="background:#cfc;"
| 65
| March 17
| @ Toronto	
| 
| Dwyane Wade (24)
| LeBron James (12)
| Dwyane Wade (9)
| Air Canada Centre18,564
| 51-14					
|- style="background:#cfc;"
| 66
| March 18
| @ Boston	
| 
| LeBron James (37)
| LeBron James (7)
| LeBron James (12)
| TD Garden18,624
| 52-14
|- style="background:#cfc;"
| 67
| March 20
| @ Cleveland	
| 
| LeBron James (25)
| LeBron James (12)
| LeBron James (10)
| Quicken Loans Arena20,561
| 53-14
|- style="background:#cfc;"
| 68
| March 22
| Detroit	
| 
| LeBron James (29)
| LeBron James (8)
| LeBron James (8)
| American Airlines Arena20,350
| 54-14
|- style="background:#cfc;"
| 69
| March 24
| Charlotte	
| 
| LeBron James (32)
| LeBron James (8)
| LeBron James (10)
| American Airlines Arena20,350
| 55-14							
|- style="background:#cfc;"
| 70
| March 25
| @ Orlando		
| 
| LeBron James (24)
| Udonis Haslem (10)
| LeBron James (11)
| Amway Center18,846
| 56-14					
|- style="background:#fcc;"
| 71
| March 27
| @ Chicago	
| 
| LeBron James (32)
| James & Wade (7)
| Mario Chalmers (4)
| United Center23,014
| 56-15			
|- style="background:#cfc;"
| 72
| March 29
| @ New Orleans	
| 
| LeBron James (36)
| Mike Miller (6)
| Dwyane Wade (9)
| New Orleans Arena18,647
| 57-15
|- style="background:#cfc;"
| 73
| March 31
| @ San Antonio	
| 
| Chris Bosh (23)
| Chris Bosh (9)
| Miller & Allen (5)
| AT&T Center18,581
| 58-15		
|- style="background:#cfc;"
					
|- style="background:#fcc;"
| 74
| April 2
| New York
| 
| Chris Bosh (23)
| Battier & Miller (8)
| Bosh & Miller (4)
| American Airlines Arena20,300
| 58-16					
|- style="background:#cfc;"
| 75
| April 5
| @ Charlotte
| 
| Mike Miller (26)
| Chris Bosh (8)
| Mario Chalmers (7)
| Time Warner Cable Arena19,568
| 59-16
|- style="background:#cfc;"
| 76
| April 6
| Philadelphia	
| 
| LeBron James (27)
| Chris Andersen (15)
| LeBron James (5)
| American Airlines Arena20,168
| 60-16
|- style="background:#cfc;"
| 77
| April 9
| Milwaukee
| 
| LeBron James (28)
| Udonis Haslem (15)
| LeBron James (7)
| American Airlines Arena19,834
| 61-16
|- style="background:#cfc;"
| 78
| April 10
| @ Washington	
| 
| Ray Allen (23)
| Mike Miller (8)
| Mario Chalmers (8)
| Verizon Center20,308
| 62-16
|- style="background:#cfc;"
| 79
| April 12
| Boston	
| 
| LeBron James (20)
| Chris Bosh (7)
| LeBron James (9)
| American Airlines Arena19,990
| 63-16
|- style="background:#cfc;"
| 80
| April 14
| Chicago
| 
| LeBron James (24)
| Chris Bosh (9)
| LeBron James (6)
| American Airlines Arena19,810
| 64-16								
|- style="background:#cfc;"
| 81
| April 15
| @ Cleveland
| 
| Rashard Lewis (19)
| Norris Cole (11)
| Norris Cole (9)
| Quicken Loans Arena19,091
| 65-16								
|- style="background:#cfc;"
| 82
| April 17
| Orlando
| 
| Wade & Miller (21)
| Lewis & Andersen (8)
| Dwyane Wade (10)
| American Airlines Arena19,949
| 66-16

Standings

Playoffs

Game log

|- style="background:#cfc;"
| 1
| April 21
| Milwaukee
| 
| LeBron James (27)
| LeBron James (10)
| LeBron James (10)
| American Airlines Arena20,006
| 1–0
|- style="background:#cfc;"
| 2
| April 23
| Milwaukee
| 
| Dwyane Wade (21)
| LeBron James (8)
| LeBron James (6)
| American Airlines Arena20,097
| 2–0
|- style="background:#cfc;"
| 3
| April 25
| @ Milwaukee
| 
| Ray Allen (23)
| Chris Bosh (14)
| Dwyane Wade (11)
| BMO Harris Bradley Center18,165
| 3–0
|- style="background:#cfc;"
| 4
| April 28
| @ Milwaukee
| 
| LeBron James (30)
| Chalmers & James (8)
| LeBron James (7)
| BMO Harris Bradley Center18,717
| 4–0

|-style="background:#fcc;"
| 1
| May 6
| Chicago
| 
| LeBron James (24)
| LeBron James (8)
| Chalmers & James (7)
| American Airlines Arena19,685
| 0–1
|- style="background:#cfc;"
| 2
| May 8
| Chicago
| 
| Ray Allen (21)
| Norris Cole (6)
| LeBron James (9)
| American Airlines Arena19,817
| 1–1
|- style="background:#cfc;"
| 3
| May 10
| @ Chicago
| 
| LeBron James (25)
| Chris Bosh (19)
| LeBron James (7)
| United Center22,675
| 2–1
|- style="background:#cfc;"
| 4
| May 13
| @ Chicago
| 
| LeBron James (27)
| Haslem & James (7)
| LeBron James (8)
| United Center21,990
|3–1
|- style="background:#cfc;"
| 5
| May 15
| Chicago
| 
| LeBron James (23)
| Bosh & James (7)
| LeBron James (8)
| American Airlines Arena20,250
|4–1

|- style="background:#cfc;"
| 1
| May 22
| Indiana
| 
| LeBron James (30)
| LeBron James (10)
| LeBron James (10)
| American Airlines Arena19,679
| 1–0
|- style="background:#fcc;"
| 2
| May 24
| Indiana
| 
| LeBron James (36)
| LeBron James (8)
| Chalmers & Wade (5)
| American Airlines Arena20,022
| 1–1
|- style="background:#cfc;"
| 3
| May 26
| @ Indiana
| 
| LeBron James (22)
| Chris Andersen (9)
| Dwyane Wade (8)
| Bankers Life Fieldhouse18,165
| 2–1
|- style="background:#fcc;"
| 4
| May 28
| @ Indiana
| 
| LeBron James (24)
| Ray Allen (7)
| Dwyane Wade (6)
| Bankers Life Fieldhouse18,165 
| 2–2
|- style="background:#cfc;"
| 5
| May 30
| Indiana
| 
| LeBron James (30)
| LeBron James (8)
| Chalmers & James (6)
| American Airlines Arena19,913 
| 3–2
|- style="background:#fcc;"
| 6
| June 1
| @ Indiana
| 
| LeBron James (29)
| Joel Anthony (8)
| LeBron James (6)
| Bankers Life Fieldhouse18,165
| 3–3
|- style="background:#cfc;"
| 7
| June 3
| Indiana
| 
| LeBron James (32)
| Dwyane Wade (9)
| Norris Cole & James (4)
| American Airlines Arena20,025
| 4–3

|- style="background:#fcc;"
| 1
| June 6
| San Antonio
| 
| LeBron James (18)
| LeBron James (18)
| LeBron James (10)
| American Airlines Arena19,775  
| 0–1
|- style="background:#cfc;"
| 2
| June 9
| San Antonio
| 
| Mario Chalmers (19)
| Chris Bosh (10)
| LeBron James (7)
| American Airlines Arena19,990  
| 1–1
|- style="background:#fcc;"
| 3
| June 11
| @ San Antonio
| 
| Dwyane Wade (16)
| LeBron James (11)
| Wade & James (5)
| AT&T Center18,581
| 1–2
|- style="background:#cfc;"
| 4
| June 13
| @ San Antonio
| 
| LeBron James (33)
| Chris Bosh (13)
| Mario Chalmers (5)
| AT&T Center18,581 
| 2–2
|- style="background:#fcc;"
| 5
| June 16
| @ San Antonio
| 
| James & Wade (25)
| Bosh & James (6)
| Dwyane Wade (10)
| AT&T Center18,581
| 2–3
|- style="background:#cfc;"
| 6
| June 18
| San Antonio
| 
| LeBron James (32)
| Chris Bosh (11)
| LeBron James (11)
| American Airlines Arena19,900
| 3–3
|- style="background:#cfc;"
| 7
| June 20
| San Antonio
| 
| LeBron James (37)
| LeBron James (12) 
| Allen & James (4)
| American Airlines Arena19,900 
| 4–3

NBA records
The following records were set or tied by the Heat this season-

Most wins in a month: The Heat went 17–1 in March 2013, becoming the first team to win 17 games in a single calendar month in NBA history.
Second longest win streak in a season: The Heat went on a 27-game win streak, becoming the second team with the longest win streak in a season behind the Lakers (33). 
Overtime in Postseason: The HEAT's 103–100 overtime win vs. SA on June 18, 2013 improved their all-time postseason overtime record to 8-1 (.889). Their .889 postseason winning percentage is the best among teams with at least three overtime games played and the second-highest among all teams.
DOUBLE-DIGIT wins in Postseason: The HEAT's 16-point, 109–93, win in Game Four of the NBA Finals at SA on June 13, 2013 was Miami's 12th double-figure win in the 2013 postseason. The 12 double-digit wins are the most by any team during a single postseason in NBA history. The previous record was 11, held by five different teams, each winning the NBA Championship that postseason. This record would later be tied by the 2013-14 San Antonio Spurs and the 2016-17 Golden State Warriors. 
Highest Field Goal Made Percentage, post season: Chris "Birdman" Andersen shot 80.7 percent (46-of-57) from the field in the 2013 postseason. He has become the first player in NBA postseason history to take at least 35 shots and shoot better than 75 percent from the field.
SIX AND SEVEN over 30 points: LeBron James scored 32 points in Game Six of the NBA Finals on June 18, 2013 and then made 37 points in Game Seven on June 20, 2013. According to Elias Sports Bureau, he became the first player in NBA history to score consecutive 30-point games to help rally his team from a 3–2 series deficit to win an NBA title. 
GAME SEVEN over 30 Points: LeBron James finished the 2013 postseason by recording his fourth-straight 30-point Game Seven by scoring 37 points vs. SA in the NBA Finals. He had previously scored 32 points vs. IND on June 3, 2013, 31 points vs. BOS on June 9, 2012 and 45 points at BOS on May 18, 2008. The Elias Sports Bureau reports he has tied the record of the only other player to score at least 30 points in four consecutive Game Seven's, Elgin Baylor (33 at STL on 3/26/60, 39 at STL on 4/1/61, 41 at BOS on 4/18/62, 35 vs. STL on 4/11/63 & 33 vs. STL on 4/15/66).
Highest Scoring average in game sevens: LeBron James is averaging 34.4 points in Game Seven's of the postseason during his career, currently the best average in NBA history.
Most 3 point FG in Postseason: Ray Allen owns the record for most 3 point field goals in the postseason – 352.
Most 4 point plays in a Finals game, 2: On June 16, 2013, Ray Allen converted two free throws after making three point field goals, one at the 5:08 mark in the 2nd quarter, and the other with 8:37 left in the 4th quarter. There had previously been only 12 four point plays in the NBA Finals history.
Team Leader in Points, Rebounds, and Assists: LeBron James’ 18 points, 18 rebounds and 10 assists vs. SA on June 6, 2013 was the 28th time he has led his team outright (no ties) in each of those categories during the playoffs, the most in NBA postseason history. In addition, he has been the outright game-high leader (no ties) in each of those categories eight times, also the most in NBA postseason history. His eight such games are more than the combined total of the next three players to achieve the feat.
25-10-8: LeBron James’ 32 points, 10 rebounds and 11 assists vs. SA on June 18, 2013 marked his 15th postseason 25-point, 10-rebound, eight-assist game, the most in NBA postseason history. According to Elias, second on this list is Oscar Robertson with 10 such games.
BACK-TO-BACKS: The HEAT recorded a 15–1 record (.938) on the second night of a back-to-back set in the 2012–13 season, tying for the best record on the second night of a back-to-back set in NBA history. The Dallas Mavericks also finished 15-1 (.938) in such games during the 2006–07 season.

Injuries
 Dwyane Wade underwent surgery on his left knee following the end of the 2011–12 season. Wade returned in time for the Heat's second pre-season game against the Los Angeles Clippers at the MasterCard Center in Beijing, China.

Transactions

Overview

 Cut from the roster during training camp.

Trades

Free agents

See also

References

Miami Heat seasons
Miami Heat
Eastern Conference (NBA) championship seasons
NBA championship seasons
Miami Heat
Miami Heat